Holleder Memorial Stadium was a 20,000 seat football stadium in Rochester, New York.

Located on Ridgeway Avenue, at the south east corner of Mount Read Blvd., it was built in 1949 to serve as the home of Aquinas Institute football.

Originally named Aquinas Memorial Stadium, it was renamed in 1974, in memory of former Aquinas and Army quarterback Don Holleder, who was killed in October, 1967, in the Battle of Ong Thanh.

The first ever win for the Buffalo Bills of the American Football League was held at the stadium; on August 13, 1960, the Bills won an exhibition game against the Denver Broncos. The Bills continued to host occasional exhibition games at the stadium through the 1960s.

Holleder Stadium was the home pitch for professional soccer's Rochester Lancers, who played at Holleder from 1967–69 as members of the American Soccer League, and 1970–80 while in the NASL. On August 21, 1977, 20,005 people, the largest crowd to attend a Lancers game at Holleder Stadium, watched Pelé lead his Cosmos to a 2–1 victory over the hometown Lancers in the first round of the 1977 NASL playoffs. It was also the host of the first match of the NASL Final 1970.

Holleder Stadium also hosted the Rochester Flash soccer team, who called Holleder Stadium home in 1981–82 (ASL) and 1984 (USL).

The stadium was torn down in 1985, and an industrial park, named Holleder Technology Park, was built on the site. Aquinas would eventually replace the stadium in 2005 with the Wegmans Sports Complex, with a smaller capacity.

Concerts
The stadium hosted several musical concerts, including:
The Grateful Dead - September 1, 1979
Journey - June 5, 1983
The Police, The Fixx and A Flock of Seagulls - August 7, 1983
The Rochester Grey Knights held the Tournament of Drums(Drum and Bugle competition) annually from 1948–1968.

Drum Corps Associates held the Senior Drum and Bugle Championships there in 1968-1971 and 1973–1976.

References

External links
Don Holleder: College Football Hall of Fame
archive.org audio of the September 1, 1979 Grateful Dead concert at Holleder Memorial Stadium

Rochester Lancers
Sports in Rochester, New York
Defunct American football venues in the United States
Defunct soccer venues in the United States
Soccer venues in New York (state)
Sports venues in Rochester, New York
North American Soccer League (1968–1984) stadiums
High school football venues in the United States
Lacrosse venues in New York (state)
1949 establishments in New York (state)
1985 disestablishments in New York (state)
Sports venues completed in 1949
Sports venues demolished in 1985
2005 establishments in New York (state)
Sports venues completed in 2005